Gmina Krasne may refer to either of the following rural administrative districts in Poland:
Gmina Krasne, Masovian Voivodeship
Gmina Krasne, Subcarpathian Voivodeship